George Faught (born July 14, 1962) is an American businessman and Republican politician from Oklahoma. Faught was Representative for District 14 in the Oklahoma House of Representatives from 2007 to 2012. House District 14 encompasses Muskogee, Fort Gibson, Braggs, Hulbert, and outlying areas. When the 51st Legislature was opened on February 5, 2007, Faught became the only Republican in state history to represent the historically Democratic 14th House District. He announced his candidacy for Oklahoma's 2nd congressional district on July 14, 2011.

Early life
George Faught was born in Brownfield, Texas, on July 14, 1962. His family relocated to Muskogee, Oklahoma, when he was 6 months old. Faught graduated from Muskogee High School in 1980 and graduated from Bryan Institute in 1987. Faught owns his own carpet cleaning business.

State Representative
In 2006, long-time Democratic State Representative Barbara Staggs was termed out of office due term limits placed on her by the Oklahoma Constitution. To succeed her, Republican Faught faced former Democratic State Representative Jeff Potts. Faught defeated Potts by receiving 54% of the vote and was elected to the 51st Oklahoma Legislature. By winning his election, Faught became the first Republican in state history to represent Muskogee in the Oklahoma Legislature. In the legislature, he was often identified with the right wing of the House GOP caucus that aligns more with Conservatives in the United States.

Faught sought reelection as State Representative in 2008. Faught faced Democrat Eugene Blankenship, Muskogee County's emergency management director. Faught won reelection with 56% of the vote and was elected to the 52nd Oklahoma Legislature.

English as official language Bills
Faught was quick to spark controversy, when in January 2007 he filed a bill to make English the official language of Oklahoma. Democratic legislators and Native American tribes, such as the Cherokee and Creek, came out strongly against this legislation.   The bill passed through committee 9-7 , but never made it to the House floor.

In the 2008 session Faught, along with Rep. Randy Terrill (R, Moore) again filed legislation to make English the Official Language of Oklahoma. This time, the bill passed through the House, but was not brought up in the Senate.

Committee Memberships
As of the 53rd Oklahoma Legislature, George Faught is a member of the following committees:
Administrative Rules & Government Oversight Committee (Chair)
Economic Development, Tourism & Financial Services Committee
Transportation Committee
Faught is also a member of the following subcommittees:
Eastern Oklahoma Redistricting Subcommittee
A&B General Government & Transportation Subcommittee

2012 Congressional Campaign
On June 7, 2011, Congressman Dan Boren announced that he would not seek reelection to Oklahoma's 2nd congressional district in 2012. Faught announced the same day that he was forming an exploratory committee for the seat.

Faught declared his official candidacy on July 14. Faught lost to candidate Markwayne Mullin in the Republican primary runoff.

Personal life
Faught is married to his wife Becky, and they have three children.

Controversy
During a debate in the Oklahoma House on restricting abortion services, Faught responded to the question "are rape and incest the will of God" by saying that "God brings beauty out of ashes".

Election history

References

1962 births
Living people
People from Brownfield, Texas
Politicians from Muskogee, Oklahoma
Republican Party members of the Oklahoma House of Representatives
21st-century American politicians
Candidates in the 2012 United States elections